Tułowice  is a village in the administrative district of Gmina Brochów, within Sochaczew County, Masovian Voivodeship, in east-central Poland.

The village has a population of 350.

There is a narrow gauge railway station and a historic manor house in the village.

History
 
The oldest known mention of the village comes from 1361. Tułowice was a private village of Polish nobility, administratively located in the Sochaczew County in the Rawa Voivodeship in the Greater Poland Province of the Polish Crown. In 1827 it had a population of 136, and in the late 19th century it had a population of 219.

Notable people
  (born 1949), Polish painter, owner of the local historic manor house

References

Villages in Sochaczew County